The Gordons is second and final album by New Zealand band The Gordons released in 1984.

Track listing
Side A
Quality Control - 3:04   
Reactor - 5:41   
Lead Room - 5:29   
Red Line - 3:42   
Side B
Identity - 3:48   
Mono Flo - 3:26   
Gone Machine - 4:19   
Joker - 2:26   
Mentus Fugit - 2:12

Personnel
Brent McLaughlin (drums)
Vince Pinker (bass, vocals)
John Halvorsen (guitar, vocals)

References

Dunedin Sound albums
1984 albums